Bad Company is a 1995 American neo-noir thriller film directed by Damian Harris and written by Ross Thomas.

The film stars Ellen Barkin and Laurence Fishburne as former CIA operatives engaging in a dubious romance while plotting to murder their boss, played by Frank Langella, and take over his firm, which specializes in blackmail and corporate espionage.

Plot
In Seattle, former CIA agent Nelson Crowe is hired by Vic Grimes for a position with his company nicknamed "The Toolshed." Grimes' firm employs people with intelligence service backgrounds to sell their talents with regard to extortion and corporate espionage to domestic and foreign corporations. Grimes' second in command, Margaret Wells, begins working with Crowe and seduces him, enticing him with a plot to murder Grimes so they can take over the firm.

The Toolshed's top client, Curl Industries, is being sued in a class action lawsuit in a case currently on appeal at the Washington State Supreme Court. Curl Industries is accused of poisoning the water supply to a small town, resulting in the birth of disabled children. Grimes gives Crowe $1 million to bribe one of the justices, Justin Beach, into swinging the verdict in favor of Curl Industries.

Crowe and Toolshed operative Todd Stapp buy Justice Beach's $25,000 gambling debt from bookmaker Bobby Birdsong and pay for information on Beach's personal life from his friend, Les Goodwin. During a secret progress report meeting, Crowe is revealed to in fact be a mole for the CIA, albeit against his will. Crowe was dismissed from the agency on suspicion of stealing a $50,000 bribe meant for an Iraqi colonel.

Crowe's former boss, William "Smitty" Smithfield, is threatening prison time or the disappearance of the bribe as leverage to get Crowe to infiltrate the Toolshed. The CIA intends to acquire the firm and use it as a black operations hub with Smitty in charge. During the meeting, as he turns over the $1 million bribe money for inspection, Crowe secretly records his conversation with Smitty, who also forces him to sign a receipt. Stapp later discovers Crowe's secret objective and extorts a payoff from Smitty to remain silent about it.

Beach accepts the $1 million bribe delivered by Crowe. He and his mistress Julie Ames sign a receipt to ensure Beach's cooperation. Beach buys tickets for a flight to the Caribbean and sends Julie ahead with the money, telling her he intends to leave his wife and join her. However, after reneging on his agreement and voting against Curl Industries, Beach commits suicide.

Despite the setback caused by Beach's death and his vote, Wells and Crowe continue with their plan to murder Grimes. Wells spends a romantic weekend with Grimes at his fishing cabin. Crowe sneaks in and shoots Grimes, then beats Wells to make it appear like the murder was a robbery gone wrong.

Wells and Crowe then take over the Toolshed, though Wells now rebuffs Crowe's affections towards her, having used him to get what she wanted. Upon hearing of her lover's death, Julie travels to Europe, sending Goodwin postcards telling him how she's enjoying spending the $1 million. Goodwin sells this information to Crowe, who takes it to Wells. Wells orders Crowe to find and kill Julie because of her knowledge of the bribe attempt. Smitty confronts Wells in her office at the Toolshed and informs her of the CIA's plan to take over and also of Crowe's involvement in the agency's infiltration.

Julie buys a gun from Goodwin and goes to Crowe's apartment to kill him in revenge for Beach's death. She arrives shortly after Wells, who also came to kill Crowe. In a chaotic shootout, Julie blindly fires at both as Crowe and Wells shoot each other dead.

Julie somehow remains unharmed. As she meticulously picks up her shell casings, she finds Crowe's briefcase containing incriminating evidence, including the tape of his conversations with Smitty and the receipt she and Beach signed. After burning the receipt, Julie mails the tape to the U.S. Attorney's office to expose the corrupt dealings of both the CIA and the Toolshed. She then leaves town for good, alone.

Cast
 Ellen Barkin as Margaret Wells
 Laurence Fishburne as Nelson Crowe
 Frank Langella as Vic Grimes
 Michael Beach as Tod Stapp
 Gia Carides as Julie Ames
 David Ogden Stiers as Judge Justin Beach
 Daniel Hugh Kelly as Les Goodwin
 Spalding Gray as Walter Curl
 James Hong as Bobby Birdsong
 Tegan West as Al
 Michael Murphy as William "Smitty" Smithfield (uncredited)
 Michelle Beaudoin as Wanda

Critical reception
The film received mostly negative reviews from critics. As of December 30, 2010, the review aggregator Rotten Tomatoes reported that 27% of critics gave the film positive reviews, based on 11 reviews. Audiences polled by CinemaScore gave the film an average grade of "C" on an A+ to F scale.

References

External links

 

1995 films
1995 crime thriller films
1990s American films
1990s English-language films
1990s psychological thriller films
American crime thriller films
American neo-noir films
American psychological thriller films
Films about the Central Intelligence Agency
Films about corruption in the United States
Films about interracial romance
Films directed by Damian Harris
Films scored by Carter Burwell
Films set in Seattle
Touchstone Pictures films